In enzymology, an adenine deaminase is an enzyme that catalyzes the chemical reaction

adenine + H2O  hypoxanthine + NH3

Thus, the two substrates of this enzyme are adenine and H2O, whereas its two products are hypoxanthine and NH3.

This enzyme belongs to the family of hydrolases, those acting on carbon-nitrogen bonds other than peptide bonds, specifically in cyclic amidines.  The systematic name of this enzyme class is adenine aminohydrolase. Other names in common use include adenase, adenine aminase, and ADase.  This enzyme participates in purine metabolism.

Structural studies

As of late 2007, only one structure has been solved for this class of enzymes, with the PDB accession code .

References

 
 

EC 3.5.4
Enzymes of known structure